BOS is a South African brand of ice tea, which uses 100% organic rooibos as the main ingredient. The company was founded by Grant Rushmere and Richard Bowsher, a rooibos tea farmer and an entrepreneur, respectively. The initial range of ice teas was launched in June 2010. BOS's headquarters are located in Woodstock, Cape Town. Alex Ferguson, former manager of Manchester United F.C., is listed as an investor.

Sustainability
BOS plants and maintains one tree for every 2,000 units sold. To date, they have planted over 20,000 trees in leafless areas of South Africa.

Products
The rooibos used in BOS is sourced from Klipopmekaar Rooibos Farm in the Cederberg Mountains in the Western Cape. The ice tea is made in six flavours:
Lemon
Peach
Berry
Ginger
Yuzu 
Lime 

BOS Sport, a sports drink range, was launched in January 2014 with four flavours:  
Lemon Lime
Mandarin Orange
Red Berry
Blueberry

Distribution
Since its launch in mid-2010, BOS has become popular in South Africa, and is now on sale in most retail outlets nationwide. In 2013, BOS launched in Belgium and the Netherlands, and plans to further expand into other African countries. Since mid 2015, BOS is also available in Singapore and the rest of Southeast Asia. In 2018, BOS made its United States market debut by launching in California.

References

External links
BOS website

Herbal tea
Iced tea brands
Products introduced in 2010
South Africa
Companies
Food and drink companies based in Cape Town
Manufacturing companies based in Cape Town